Sui Fengfu (born 3 December 1956) is a former Chinese agricultural official who spent most of his career in Heilongjiang province. He was the Party Secretary of Heilongjiang Provincial State-owned Farms Administrative Bureau, China's largest state-owned agriculture cooperative that employs some 900,000 people. Sui also served as the Vice Chairman of the Standing Committee of the Heilongjiang People's Congress, i.e., the provincial legislature. 

In November 2014, Sui was placed under investigation by the Communist Party's anti-corruption agency. Sui was the second high-ranking politician being examined from Heilongjiang province after the 18th Party Congress in 2012.

Life and career
Sui was born and raised in Penglai, Shandong. He earned a MBA from Harbin Institute of Technology in 2011, he was also studied at Central Party School of the Chinese Communist Party as a part-time student. He became involved in politics in September 1977 and joined the Chinese Communist Party in May 1987.

Beginning in September 1977, he served in several posts in Heilongjiang Provincial State-owned Farms Administrative Bureau, including director, deputy CPC Party Chief, and CPC Party Chief.

In January 2013, he was promoted to become the Deputy head of the standing committee of the Heilongjiang provincial people's congress, he is also served as the CPC Party Chief and director of Heilongjiang Provincial State-owned Farms Administrative Bureau. The Bureau owns a large number of farms throughout the province and employs some 900,000 people, making Sui's position as its Party Secretary extremely powerful.

Sui was a delegate to the 11th National People's Congress. Sui also once served as a guest professor at Heilongjiang Bayi Agricultural University and Northeast Agricultural University, and vice-president of Young Entrepreneurs Association in Heilongjiang.

Downfall
On November 27, 2014, Sui was placed under investigation by the Central Commission for Discipline Inspection for "serious violations of laws and regulations".

On February 13, 2015, the Central Commission for Discipline Inspection issued a press release, announcing that Sui was expelled from the Communist Party. The CCDI said that Sui used the convenience of his office to seek illicit gains for others and took "huge bribes", and that he did not "change his ways" after the 18th Party Congress. His case was then moved to criminal prosecution.

On December 19, 2016, Sui was sentenced to 11 years in prison for taking bribes. He was found guilty of taking advantage of his positions between 2003 and 2014, including selection and promotion of several individuals.

References

1956 births
Politicians from Yantai
Living people
Political office-holders in Heilongjiang
Chinese Communist Party politicians from Shandong
People's Republic of China politicians from Shandong
Expelled members of the Chinese Communist Party
Chinese politicians convicted of corruption
People from Penglai, Shandong